Alltmawr is a village in the  community of Erwood, Powys, Wales, which is 44 miles (71 km) from Cardiff and 144 miles (232 km) from London. St Mauritius Church at Alltmawr is counted as being one of the smallest in Wales.

References

See also
List of localities in Wales by population

Villages in Powys